The Humdinger Color Computer was an 8-bit home computer introduced in 1983 by Venture Micro, Inc., of Cupertino, California.

It had the following specifications:

 Zilog Z80 microprocessor
 4 KB of main memory (expandable to 64 KB)
 58-key, chiclet-style keyboard with rubber keys
 A 256×192 pixel, 8 color display with 12 modes
 4 channel "arcade quality" sound
 Centronics parallel printer interface
 RS-232 serial port
 Joystick port
 Cartridge port

The original retail price was US$129.95. It made its first appearance at the eighth annual West Coast Computer Faire, held from March 18 to March 20, 1983. It was released to retailers in the United States in mid-May 1983. Intended as a ZX Spectrum killer, the Humdinger computer proved short-lived in the marketplace, as Venture Micro dissolved in 1984.

References 

Computer-related introductions in 1983
Z80-based home computers